Tierra Blanca is a Mexican city (and municipality) located in the Northeast region of the state of Guanajuato. The municipality had a population of 14,515 inhabitants according to the 2005 census. In pre-Hispanic times the area of what is today Tierra Blanca was mostly inhabited by Chichimeca people.

Tierra Blanca was founded and granted the title of municipality in 1536 under the order of the first viceroy of New Spain, Antonio de Mendoza, making it one of the oldest in the state of Guanajuato.

The municipal president of Tierra Blanca and its many smaller outlying communities is Ernesto Reyes Pérez.

References

Municipalities of Guanajuato
Populated places in Guanajuato
Populated places established in 1536
1536 establishments in the Spanish Empire